
Gmina Dzierzgoń is an urban-rural gmina (administrative district) in Sztum County, Pomeranian Voivodeship, in northern Poland.

Villages
Apart from the town of Dzierzgoń, Gmina Dzierzgoń contains the villages and settlements of Ankamaty, Bągart, Blunaki, Bruk, Budzisz, Chartowo, Chojty, Jasna, Jeziorno, Judyty, Kamienna Góra, Kuksy, Lisi Las, Litewki, Minięta, Morany, Nowa Karczma, Nowiec, Nowiny, Pachoły, Pawłowo, Piaski Sztumskie, Poliksy, Prakwice, Spalonki, Stanówko, Stanowo, Stara Wieś, Tywęzy and Żuławka Sztumska.

Neighbouring gminas
Gmina Dzierzgoń is bordered by the gminas of Markusy, Mikołajki Pomorskie, Rychliki, Stare Pole, Stary Dzierzgoń and Stary Targ.

References
Polish official population figures 2006

Dzierzgon
Sztum County